Methylmalonic aciduria type A protein, mitochondrial also known as MMAA is a protein that in humans is encoded by the MMAA gene.

Function

The protein encoded by this gene is involved in the translocation of cobalamin into the mitochondrion, where it is used in the final steps of adenosylcobalamin synthesis. Adenosylcobalamin is a coenzyme required for the activity of methylmalonyl-CoA mutase.

Clinical significance

Mutations in the MMAA gene are associated with methylmalonic acidemia.

References

External links
  GeneReviews/NCBI/NIH/UW entry on Methylmalonic Acidemia

Further reading